The 2013 AdvoCare V100 Bowl was an American college football bowl game that was played on December 31, 2013 at Independence Stadium in Shreveport, Louisiana. The 38th edition of the game otherwise known as the Independence Bowl, it matched up the Boston College Eagles from the Atlantic Coast Conference and the Arizona Wildcats from the Pac-12 Conference.  The game kicked off at 11:30 a.m. CST and aired on ESPN.  It was one of the 2013–14 bowl games that concluded the 2013 FBS football season. Arizona defeated Boston College by a score of 42–19. This was the final edition with nutritional supplement company AdvoCare as the title sponsor, and the only edition not to include "Independence Bowl" in the official name.

Teams
Boston College finished the regular season with a record of 7–5 (4–4 ACC).  Arizona's record was 7–5 (4–5 Pac-12).

The game featured the nation's top two running backs in BC's Andre Williams who was the 2013 Doak Walker Award winner and a Heisman Trophy finalist and in Arizona's Ka'Deem Carey who was also a finalist for the Doak Walker Award. Williams and Carey were FBS ranked first and second respectively in yards per game and both were consensus 2013 All-Americans, with Williams being a unanimous choice.

Arizona

Boston College

Game summary

Scoring summary

Statistics

Game notes
 November 27, 2013 – It was announced that B-25 to fly over Independence Stadium prior to kickoff of 2013 AdvoCare V100 Bowl

References

Independence Bowl
Independence Bowl
Arizona Wildcats football bowl games
Boston College Eagles football bowl games
Independence Bowl
December 2013 sports events in the United States